CJIE-FM is a Canadian radio station which broadcasts a country/pop/rock format on the frequency of 107.5 FM (MHz) in Winnipeg Beach, Manitoba and rebroadcasts its signal at 99.5 CJIE-FM-1 in Arborg, Manitoba, Canada.

History 
Owned by 5777152 Manitoba Ltd., the station received CRTC approval on February 10, 2010 but was required to select a frequency other than the proposed 93.7 MHz.  A frequency of 107.5 MHz was approved on July 28, 2010.

Launched in June 2011, the station boasts a high content and quality of local news items and interesting interviews. CJIE-FM proudly lives up to its logo, "The Voice of the Interlake." The studio is located in the heart of Gimli, on the boardwalk at 10 Centre Street.

In the autumn of 2012, CJIE-FM was nominated for, and won, a prestigious award from the Interlake Tourism Association, for their contributions in promoting the Interlake.

References

External links
 

Jie
Radio stations established in 2011
2011 establishments in Manitoba